Maciej Nalepa  (born 31 March 1978 in Tarnów) is a Polish football goalkeeper.

Career
Nalepa previously played for Ukrainian sides FC Karpaty Lviv and FC Kharkiv. In February 2011, he joined Odra Wodzisław.

He was a part of Poland national football team in which he played two times.

References

External links
 
 
 
 Profile on Official FC Kharkiv Website

1978 births
Living people
Polish footballers
Polish expatriate footballers
Association football goalkeepers
Odra Wodzisław Śląski players
Piast Gliwice players
FC Kharkiv players
FC Karpaty Lviv players
Ekstraklasa players
Ukrainian Premier League players
Expatriate footballers in Ukraine
Expatriate footballers in Latvia
Polish expatriate sportspeople in Ukraine
Polish expatriate sportspeople in Latvia
Sportspeople from Tarnów
FK Venta players
Stal Rzeszów players
Poland international footballers
Resovia (football) players
Hetman Zamość players
Stal Stalowa Wola players